Boris Vasković (Serbian Cyrillic: Борис Васковић; born 14 September 1975) is a Serbian former professional footballer who played as a midfielder.

While playing for Sartid Smederevo, Vasković won the Serbia and Montenegro Cup in 2003.

In 2002, Vasković made three appearances for the national team of FR Yugoslavia.

Statistics

Honours
Sartid Smederevo
 Serbia and Montenegro Cup: 2002–03

References

External links
 
 

Serbia and Montenegro footballers
Association football midfielders
First League of Serbia and Montenegro players
FK Mačva Šabac players
FK Mladost Apatin players
FK Smederevo players
FK Vojvodina players
OFK Beograd players
Serbia and Montenegro international footballers
Serbs of Bosnia and Herzegovina
Footballers from Sarajevo
1975 births
Living people